Florence Sireau-Gossiaux (born 25 May 1966) is a paralympic athlete from France competing mainly in category T52 sprint events.

Biography
Gossiaux first competed in the Paralympics in 1988 in the 100m, 200m, 400m, 800m and 1500m winning a silver in the 800m. At the next games in 1992 she again competed in the 100m, 200m 400m and 800m and this time won a silver in the 100m and a bronze in 800m.  After missing the 1996 games she next competed in the 2000 Summer Paralympics in the 100m winning a bronze medal and the 300m and 400m.

References

External links 
 
 

1966 births
Living people
People from L'Isle-Adam, Val-d'Oise
Sportspeople from Val-d'Oise
Paralympic athletes of France
Athletes (track and field) at the 1988 Summer Paralympics
Athletes (track and field) at the 1992 Summer Paralympics
Athletes (track and field) at the 2000 Summer Paralympics
Paralympic silver medalists for France
Paralympic bronze medalists for France
Medalists at the 1988 Summer Paralympics
Medalists at the 1992 Summer Paralympics
Medalists at the 2000 Summer Paralympics
Paralympic medalists in athletics (track and field)
French wheelchair racers
20th-century French women